This article list the results of men's singles category in the 2007 BWF World Championships (World Badminton Championships).

Seeds 

  Lin Dan (world champion)
  Lee Chong Wei (third round)
  Chen Jin (third round)
  Bao Chunlai (semi-final)
  Peter Gade (quarter-final)
  Chen Yu (semi-final)
  Kenneth Jonassen (quarter-final)
  Taufik Hidayat (second round)

  Sony Dwi Kuncoro (final)
  Shoji Sato (second round)
  Ronald Susilo (quarter-final)
  Przemysław Wacha (third round)
  Muhammad Hafiz Hashim (third round)
  Park Sung-hwan (third round)
  Dicky Palyama (third round)
  Simon Santoso (third round)

Draw

Finals

Section 1

Section 2

Section 3

Section 4

Sources 
Tournamentsoftware.com: 2007 World Championships - Men's singles

- Men's singles, 2007 Bwf World Championships